The 1984 NCAA Division I women's basketball tournament began on March 16 and ended on April 1. It featured 32 teams, four fewer than the previous year. Tennessee, Louisiana Tech, Cheyney, and Southern California were the Final Four, with Southern California defeating Tennessee, 72-61, for its second straight title.  USC's Cheryl Miller was named the Most Outstanding Player of the tournament. The semi-finals and finals were held in Pauley Pavilion on the campus of UCLA in Los Angeles, California.

Notable events
Three of the four team earning a bid to the Final Four did so winning the Regional game on their own floor. The exception, the East Regional was held at a neutral site, the Norfolk Scope, but that was the home town of Old Dominion, who had won 45 consecutive home games, before meeting Cheyney State in the East Regional final. Cheyney State won by a score of 80–71. The win matched them up against the three seed Tennessee, who upset Georgia to win the Mideast Regional. The score of the semi-final was also 80–71, but this time the Lady Vols were the victor.

In 1983, USC and Louisiana Tech met in the National championship game, with USC prevailing. The two teams next played in the regular season in January 1984, with Louisiana Tech beating USC 75–66 in at the home court of La Tech.. In the 1984 Tournament, USC advanced to the Final Four by beating Long Beach State 90–74, in the West Region, while Louisiana Tech beat Texas 85–60, to win the Midwest Regional. This set up a rematch, in the national semifinal. The game was close, and tied at 57 points apiece with under three minutes to go, when Cheryl Miller scored the last five points of the game to help USC advance to the championship game 62–57.

The score of the championship game was reasonably close, 72–61, but according to Sports Illustrated, "USC outscored, out-passed, outdanced and just plain outflashed Tennessee". Led by Cheryl Miller and the McGee twins, Pamela and Paula, USC won its second consecutive National Championship. Helped by the school's proximity to the media outlets, Women's basketball received considerable media coverage, with the three stars of the team participating in many print interviews and almost 75 television appearances.

Records
Mary Ostrowski hit nine of nine attempted free throws, the second most for an individual player in a Final Four game, the National Semi-final.

Over the two games of the Final four, she hit 15 of 15, the only player to hit every free throw (minimum 12 attempts) in Final Four games.

Tennessee, as a team, hit nine of nine attempted free throws, the second most for team in a Final Four game, in the National championship game.

Long Beach State scored 22 points in an overtime period, in the West Regional semi-final, the most ever scored in an NCAA tournament overtime period.

Qualifying teams – automatic
Thirty-two teams were selected to participate in the 1984 NCAA Tournament. Seventeen conferences were eligible for an automatic bid to the 1984 NCAA tournament. (Not all conference records are available for 1984)

Qualifying teams – at-large
Fifteen additional teams were selected to complete the thirty-two invitations.

Bids by conference
Seventeen conferences earned an automatic bid. In eleven cases, the automatic bid was the only representative from the conference. Twelve at-large teams were selected from six of the conferences. In addition, three independent (not associated with an athletic conference) teams earned at-large bids.

First round
In 1984, the field returned to 32 teams, in the same format as in 1982. The teams were seeded, and assigned to four geographic regions, with seeds 1-8 in each region. In  Round 1, the higher seed was given the opportunity to host the first-round game. In most cases, the higher seed accepted the opportunity. The exceptions:
 Ole Miss was a 4 seed, but unable to host, so the game was played at 5 seed Ohio State
 Alabama was a 2 seed, but played at Central Michigan, the 7 seed
 Missouri was a 4 seed, but played at LSU, the 5 seed
 Kansas State was a 3 seed, but played at Northeast Louisiana, the 6 seed
 Oregon was a 3 seed, but played at San Diego State, the 6 seed
 Long Beach State was a 2 seed, playing the 7 seed, University of Nevada, Las Vegas. The game was played at the University of Southern California (USC). For this reason there are only 15 first round venues, as all locations hosted one game except the Los Angeles Memorial Sports Arena, home of USC, which hosted two games.

The following table lists the region, host school, venue and the 15 first round locations.

Regionals and Final Four

The regionals, named for the general location, were held from March 22 to March 25 at these sites:
 East Regional   Norfolk Scope, Norfolk, Virginia (Host: Old Dominion University)
 Mideast Regional  Stokely Athletic Center, Knoxville, Tennessee (Host: University of Tennessee)
 Midwest Regional  Thomas Assembly Center, Ruston, Louisiana (Host: Louisiana Tech University)
 West Regional  Los Angeles Memorial Sports Arena, Los Angeles, California (Host:  University of California, Los Angeles)

Each regional winner advanced to the Final Four, held March 30 and April 1  in Los Angeles, California at Pauley Pavilion.

Bids by state

The thirty-two teams came from twenty-two states.
California and Louisiana had the most teams with three each.  Twenty-eight states did not have any teams receiving bids.

Brackets

Mideast regional – University of Tennessee - Knoxville, TN (Stokely Athletic Center)

Midwest regional – Louisiana Tech - Ruston, LA (Thomas Assembly Center)

East regional – Old Dominion - Norfolk, VA (Norfolk Scope)

West regional – Los Angeles, CA (Los Angeles Memorial Sports Arena)

Final Four – University of Southern California Los Angeles, CA (Pauley Pavilion)

Record by  conference
Ten conferences had more than one bid,  or at least one win in NCAA Tournament play:

Eight conferences  went 0-1: Atlantic 10, Big East, Big Ten, High Country, Metro, MAC,  Missouri Valley Conference, and Ohio Valley Conference

All-Tournament team

 Cheryl Miller, Southern California
 Paula McGee, Southern California
 Pam McGee, Southern California
 Janice Lawrence, Louisiana Tech
 Mary Ostrowski, Tennessee

Game officials

 Tommie Salerno (semifinal)
 Larry Sheppard (semifinal)
 Bob Olsen (semifinal, final)
 Marcy Weston (semifinal, final)

See also
 1984 NCAA Division I men's basketball tournament
 1984 NCAA Division II women's basketball tournament
 1984 NCAA Division III women's basketball tournament
 1984 NAIA women's basketball tournament

References

 
NCAA Division I women's basketball tournament
NCAA Division I women's basketball tournament
NCAA Division I women's basketball tournament
NCAA Division I women's basketball tournament
Basketball competitions in Austin, Texas
Basketball competitions in Los Angeles
College sports tournaments in California
Women's sports in California